Nowhere to Run is a 1978 American drama television film directed by Richard Lang, based on the 1976 novel The Blackjack Hijack by Charles Einstein.

Plot
Unlucky private eye Herbie Stolz (Allen Garfield) narrates about an exceptional client, Harry Adams (David Janssen), who had caught Herbie spying on him, and turns the tables around using him to spy on his wife, later confirmed to be having an affair.

With the background of President Kennedy's assassination, Harry has decided to totally replace his unhappy life with a more successful one, by using a method he devised for winning money at blackjack. He grows a beard, learns of an identity which he can adopt without harming anyone, and slowly builds up his escape which will be under the false identity, and will include a false suicide, ridding him of his real identity, and leaving no one in pursuit of him, with all his potential adversaries including his wife, receiving ample compensation and no hard feelings against him.

Harry's plot is accomplished with the paid assistance of Herbie who slowly discovers and comprehends what his employer's plans are, while confronting his own unlucky life, bad divorce and bad job, which he seems to be stuck in.

Amy, a beautiful woman (Linda Evans) falls in love with Harry, and towards the end of the movie, as he is completing his escape, he decides to change his flight destination to Israel coinciding with Amy's. The money from the blackjack winnings is in his suitcase taken as personal luggage. A woman with an identical suitcase boards the plane.

At a stop in Greece, terrorists who have robbed a bank board the plane. All passengers are now being checked while the authorities are hoping to find the stolen money. Harry exchanges his suitcase with the lady's, and she is arrested but then released. The terrorists then open their suitcase and discover the lady's underwear inside.

At the hotel room in Israel Harry and Amy open his suitcase and discover that the terrorist bank-robbers mistakenly had exchanged their suitcase with the lady's first, and so they have even more money than he had originally accumulated from the blackjack winnings.

Back at his office Herbie tells the viewers that somehow, although Harry had showed him how to work the blackjack-winning method, he never won, and he is stuck with his continued "bad luck".

Cast
 Lucky man - Harry Adams: David Janssen
 Wife - Marian Adams: Stefanie Powers
 Private eye - Herbie Stoltz: Allen Garfield
 Second love - Amy Kessler: Linda Evans
 Wife's friend - Charleen:  Ahna Capri
 Wife's mother: Neva Patterson
 Wife's father: John Randolph
 Joe Anasto: Anthony Eisley
 McEnerney: James Keach
 Kaufman: Lance LeGault
 Christos: Lionel Decker
 Spense: Charles Siebert
 Dr. Steinberg: Richard McKenzie
 Mohr: Kenneth Tobey
 O'Neil: John Finnegan
 Neft: Antony Alda
 Mrs. Schneider: Ivy Bethune
 Maid (tells Harry about Kennedy): Marilyn Coleman
 Oliver: Paul Tulley
 Room service waiter: Kopi Sotiropulos

References

External links

 The movie opening (YouTube)
 The Blackjack Hijack novel (1976) on Amazon

1978 drama films
1978 films
1978 television films
American drama television films
MTM Enterprises films
Films directed by Richard Lang (director)
1970s American films
1970s English-language films